Ugo Legrand (born 22 January 1989, Mont-Saint-Aignan) is a judoka from France. In 2012, he won bronze at the 2012 Summer Olympics in the -73 kg class.  He won his first match against Tomasz Adamiec, and his second against Hussein Hafiz. After losing his quarterfinal again Dex Elmont, he was entered into the repechage.  He won his first repechage match against Rasul Boqiev before winning his bronze medal match against Wang Ki-Chun.

References

External links

 
 
 
 

Living people
1989 births
French male judoka
Judoka at the 2012 Summer Olympics
Olympic medalists in judo
Olympic bronze medalists for France
Olympic judoka of France
Medalists at the 2012 Summer Olympics
Knights of the Ordre national du Mérite
People from Mont-Saint-Aignan
Sportspeople from Seine-Maritime
21st-century French people